The Centenary Quaich (Scottish Gaelic: Cuach nan Ceud Bliadhna; Irish: Corn na Céad Bliain) is an international rugby union award contested annually by Ireland and Scotland as part of the Six Nations Championship.

A "Quaich" is a Gaelic drinking vessel and has been presented to the winners of the fixture since 1989. It was introduced to mark the centenary of the founding of the International Rugby Football Board (founded 1887, which later became World Rugby). Since the introduction of the cup, Ireland have won it twenty times while Scotland have won it fourteen times, with one drawn fixture.

The Quaich is one of a number of similar cups contested for between individual teams as part of their international fixture list. Other examples within the Six Nations Championship include the Calcutta Cup (Scotland vs. England), the Millennium Trophy (England vs. Ireland), the Giuseppe Garibaldi Trophy (France vs. Italy) and the Auld Alliance Trophy between France and Scotland.

The contest for the Quaich has been notable for periods of dominance by one or other team; Scotland held the trophy for eleven years when first contested, while Ireland have dominated from 2000 onwards.

The current holders are Ireland who won a sixth successive contest after beating Scotland at Murrayfield Stadium on 12 March 2023.

Matches

Results

See also
History of rugby union matches between Ireland and Scotland

References

External links 
Scotland vs Ireland Head-to-Head Rugby Data 

Six Nations Championship trophies
History of rugby union matches between Ireland and Scotland
Recurring sporting events established in 1989
1989 establishments in Ireland
1989 establishments in Scotland
International rugby union competitions hosted by Ireland
International rugby union competitions hosted by Scotland